North Wood County Park is a county park in the U.S. state of Wisconsin. North Wood County Park was so named for its location relative to nearby South Wood County Park.

Amenities include campsites, disc golf course, playground, and a hiking trail.

References

Geography of Wood County, Wisconsin
Parks in Wisconsin